John Black (c. 1765 – 4 September 1823) was a Scottish merchant and politician in New Brunswick. He represented Northumberland County in the Legislative Assembly of New Brunswick from 1793 to 1795.

He was born in Aberdeen and came to Saint John, New Brunswick in 1785 as an Admiralty agent. Black was also an agent for Blair and Glenie, a Scottish firm that traded in timber. In 1787, he went into business in Saint John for himself. His brother William and two cousins later joined him in the business. He also became involved in the trade of salted fish with the West Indies and established his own trading fleet of at least nine vessels. Black encouraged the local production of hemp for the production of cord for use on ships. 

In 1806, he moved to Halifax, Nova Scotia. Black was named president of the North British Society in 1809. In 1813, he was named to the Nova Scotia Council. Black was married twice: first to Mary, the widow of John McGeorge, in 1797 and then to Catherine, the daughter of Christopher Billopp, in 1807. Black constructed what is now known as the Black-Binney House, displaying influences from contemporary Scottish and Aberdonian architecture of the time. After suffering poor health later in life and travelling to Britain in hopes of a cure, Black died in Aberdeen.

His daughter Rosina Jane married James Boyle Uniacke.

See also 
 List of oldest buildings and structures in Halifax, Nova Scotia

References 

1760s births
Year of birth uncertain
1823 deaths
Members of the Legislative Assembly of New Brunswick
Colony of New Brunswick people
Members of the Legislative Council of Nova Scotia
Scottish emigrants to pre-Confederation New Brunswick
People from Aberdeen
Businesspeople in timber
Scottish merchants
Canadian merchants